A whippet is a medium-sized sighthound.

Whippet may also refer to:

Vehicles
 Whippet (A1 locomotive), a 4-4-0 passenger steam locomotive
 Whippet (B3 locomotive), a 4-4-0 passenger steam locomotive
 Whippet (bicycle), an 1880s safety bicycle
 Whippet (car), a brand of small cars
 Austin Whippet, a British single-seat light aircraft
 Blériot-Whippet, a British four-wheeled cyclecar
 Medium Mark A Whippet, a British tank
 USS Whippet, the name of more than one United States Navy ship

Other uses
 Ashley Whippet (1971–1985), a Whippet owned by Alex Stein of Ohio
 Whipped-cream charger, a steel cylinder or cartridge filled with nitrous oxide also referred to as a "whippet" or "whippit"
 Whippet cookie, a chocolate-coated marshmallow treat
 Whippet (bus company), in Cambridgeshire, England
 Whippet Field, a private-use airport in Oregon

See also
 Whip It (disambiguation), including Whippit

pl:Whippet